Tudric is a brand name for pewterware made by W. H. Haseler's of Birmingham for Liberty & Co. of London, the chief designer being Archibald Knox, together with David Veazey, Oliver Baker and Rex Silver. The gold and silver ranges were known as Cymric (pro: Koomric).  Liberty began producing Tudric in 1899, and continued to the 1930s.  The designs use Art Nouveau and Celtic Revival styles, and remain popular with collectors.

Tudric pewter differentiated from other pewters with better quality, it had higher content of silver. Pewter is traditionally known as "the poor man's silver".

Gallery

Art Nouveau
Celtic art
Celtic Revival
Decorative arts
Antiques